Mull is an Anglicization of the Gaelic Maol, a term for a rounded hill, summit, or mountain, bare of trees (it has also been used, in Gaelic, to refer to a forehead, or to a shaved head). As an adjective, the word is used to indicate something which is bare, dull, or bald. In Scotland, the term is most commonly used in the southwest, where it is often applied to headlands or promontories, and, often more specifically, for the tip of that promontory or peninsula.

Gaelic spelling rules require that maol, in certain syntactical arrangements, be lenited: that is, an h is inserted after the first letter, if the first letter is a consonant (and not an l, n, or r). This h makes the preceding consonant silent, or changes its sound (mh, or bh, for instance, are silent or sound like an English v). In some circumstances (e.g., genitive case), in addition to lenition, the last consonant must be slender (proceeded and followed, if applicable by an i or an e). As both vowels in maol are broad, an i is inserted after. These two changes alter the sound of maol (rhymes with mull) to mhaoil (rhymes with uell, or well), as in Creachmhaoil (creach + maol). Consequently, 'maol', where it appears combined in place names, may not be Anglicized as mull. Creachmhaoil is typically Anglicized (as a toponym) as Craughwell. The reverse is also true, and though mull appears in numerous Irish and Scottish toponyms, a convoluted history of Anglicizations means that in many it may have no connection to the word maol.

The Gaelic mullach (often found as mullagh) is a variation of maol/mull. Dwelly's (Scottish) Gaelic-to-English dictionary gives the basic definition: the top, summit, or extremity of anything. It is common in the names of Irish prominences, such as Mullaghmore (An Mullach Mór), Mullaghaneany, Mullaghcloga, and Mullaghcarn.

Notable mulls include:
The Mull of Kintyre
The Mull of Galloway
The Mull of Oa, otherwise simply The Oa, a headland on Islay
The Mull of Cara, a promontory at the south of Cara Island
The Mull of Logan, a promontory on the Rhins of Galloway
Mull Head, a headland on the Orkney Mainland
Creachmhaoil in County Galway, in Ireland.
 Mull Hill, Isle of Man.

Mull, the Inner Hebridean island's name has a different, pre-Gaelic derivation.

Notes

References 
Ballin Smith, Beverley; Taylor, Simon; Williams, Gareth (eds) (2007) West Over Sea: Studies in Scandinavian Sea-Borne Expansion and Settlement Before 1300. Leiden. Koninklijke Brill. 

Celtic words and phrases
Celtic toponyms
Scottish words and phrases
Irish words and phrases
Scottish toponyms
Irish toponyms